Seymour Gahraman oglu Mamedov (18 September 1971, Füzuli, Azerbaijan SSR - 1 April 1992, Melikcanlı, Khojavend District, Azerbaijan) was the National Hero of Azerbaijan and warrior during the First Nagorno-Karabakh War.

Early life and education 
Mamedov was born on September 18, 1971 in Füzuli raion of Azerbaijan SSR. In 1988, he completed his secondary education at the Secondary School No 2. In 1988, he entered Azerbaijan Technical University. In 1991, he was drafted to the military service. He served in Germany and Ukraine.

Personal life 
Mamedov was single.

First Nagorno-Karabakh War 
Seymour Mamedov voluntarily joined the self-defense battalion as he was discharged from the army. He participated in releasing several villages, taking back hostages from Armenian Armed Forces. On April 1, 1992, he was killed in a heavy battle around the village of Melikcanlı.

Honors 
Seymour Gahraman oglu Mamedov was posthumously awarded the title of the "National Hero of Azerbaijan" by Presidential Decree No. 131 dated 11 August 1992. 

He was buried at a Martyrs' Lane cemetery in Baku. A school where he studied was named after him.

See also 
 First Nagorno-Karabakh War
 List of National Heroes of Azerbaijan

References

Sources 
Vugar Asgarov. Azərbaycanın Milli Qəhrəmanları (Yenidən işlənmiş II nəşr). Bakı: "Dərələyəz-M", 2010, səh. 206.

1971 births
1992 deaths
Azerbaijani military personnel
Azerbaijani military personnel of the Nagorno-Karabakh War
Azerbaijani military personnel killed in action
National Heroes of Azerbaijan
People from Fuzuli District